West Quantoxhead is a small village and civil parish in the Somerset West and Taunton district of Somerset, England. It lies on the route of the Coleridge Way and on the A39 road at the foot of the Quantock Hills,  from East Quantoxhead,  from Williton and equidistant from Bridgwater and Taunton. The parish includes the hamlets of Weacombe and Lower Weacombe.

West Quantoxhead is also known as St Audries. The St Audries Manor Estate was named for the dedication of the parish church to Æthelthryth known as St Ethelreda, who was also known as St Audrey.

History
"West Quantoxhead is spelt as Cantocheve in the Domesday Book. West Quantoxhead is listed amongst the large number of manors that are owned  by William de Moyon.

In 1086, the book notes that: "William himself owns West Quantoxhead" . Alnoth held it TRE and it paid geld for three and a half hides. There is land for eight ploughs. In demesne are 3 ploughs and 7 slaves and 10 villans and 4 bordars with 6 ploughs. There are sixteen acres of meadow and 30 of woodland and pasture 1 league by one league. It was worth three pounds, now four."

The parish of West Quantoxhead was part of the Williton and Freemanners Hundred.

The manor was held from the early 13th century by the Cauntelo family, and from about 1400 to 1736 by the Malets.

The manor of St Audries was bought by Sir Peregrine Palmer Fuller-Palmer-Acland of the Acland baronets in 1836.

St Audries Park, the manor house of the Aclands was renovated between 1835 and 1870. The property was divided in 1934, when the house was sold and turned into St Audries School, which remained in occupation until 1990, when the house was sold to the Amitabha Buddhist Centre. It was sold again in 2001.

Alexander Fuller-Acland-Hood PC was the Conservative Party Member of Parliament for Wellington from 1892 until 1911, Vice-Chamberlain of the Household from 1900 to 1902 and Parliamentary Secretary to the Treasury (Chief Whip) from 1902 until 1905. He was sworn a Privy Counsellor in 1904. In 1911, he was ennobled as Baron St Audries.

Governance
The parish council has responsibility for local issues, including setting an annual precept (local rate) to cover the council's operating costs and producing annual accounts for public scrutiny. The parish council evaluates local planning applications and works with the local police, district council officers, and neighbourhood watch groups on matters of crime, security, and traffic. The parish council's role also includes initiating projects for the maintenance and repair of parish facilities, as well as consulting with the district council on the maintenance, repair, and improvement of highways, drainage, footpaths, public transport, and street cleaning. Conservation matters (including trees and listed buildings) and environmental issues are also the responsibility of the council.

The village falls within the non-metropolitan district of Somerset West and Taunton, which was established on 1 April 2019. It was previously in the district of West Somerset, which was formed on 1 April 1974 under the Local Government Act 1972, and part of Williton Rural District before that. The district council is responsible for local planning and building control, local roads, council housing, environmental health, markets and fairs, refuse collection and recycling, cemeteries and crematoria, leisure services, parks, and tourism.

Somerset County Council is responsible for running the largest and most expensive local services such as education, social services, libraries, main roads, public transport, policing and  fire services, trading standards, waste disposal and strategic planning.

The appropriate electoral ward is 'West Quantock'. The ward stretches from East Quantoxhead south to Bicknoller. The total ward population at the 2011 Census is 1,088.

It is also part of the Bridgwater and West Somerset county constituency represented in the House of Commons of the Parliament of the United Kingdom. It elects one Member of Parliament (MP) by the first past the post system of election, and was part of the South West England constituency of the European Parliament prior to Britain leaving the European Union in January 2020, which elected seven MEPs using the d'Hondt method of party-list proportional representation.

Geography
The Quantock Hills are largely formed by rocks of the Devonian Period, which consist of sediments originally laid down under a shallow sea and slowly compressed into solid rock. In the higher north western areas older Early Devonian rocks, known as Hangman Grits, predominate, and can be seen in the exposed rock at West Quantoxhead quarry, which were worked for road building.

Religious sites

The old medieval church in the village became so dilapidated that it was entirely rebuilt in 1856 leaving only the shaft of a cross  from the original building in the churchyard, two of the bells dated 1440, a Norman font and a stone coffin. The new church, rededicated to St. Ethel Dreda, was built by John Morton for Sir Peregrine Acland and his son-in-law, Sir Alexander Fuller-Acland-Hood, 1st Baron St Audries of the Acland baronets.

References

Civil parishes in Somerset
Villages in West Somerset